Our Father Who Art in the Tree is a 2002 debut novel by Australian writer Judy Pascoe. It is written from the perspective of 10-year-old Simone who believes her late father is living in the tree in her backyard.

The novel was reissued as Our Father Who Art in a Tree in the United States and Canada; and after the 2010 film adaptation directed by Julie Bertuccelli, it was reprinted as The Tree by Murdoch Books.

Translations
Japanese: 
Traditional Chinese: 
German: 
French: 
Swedish: 
Czech: 
Italian: 
Simplified Chinese:

Film adaptation 
Our Father Who Art in the Tree has been adapted into a 2010 feature film entitled The Tree by writer/director Julie Bertuccelli and stars Charlotte Gainsbourg. It was filmed in Boonah, Queensland and is an official French/Australian co-production between Les Films du Poisson and Taylor Media, with Yaël Fogiel and Sue Taylor (Producer) as co-producers. The film was shown at the 2010 New Zealand International Film Festival  as well as the Chicago International Film Festival.

References

External links
Reading Group Guides
Goodreads
Read first chapter at Amazon.co.uk
judypascoe.com
Book interview with Judy Pascoe
Long interview with Judy Pascoe
Book review
American publisher's page of the book
 (0-375-75987-5)
French publisher's page of the book
Inside Film and Television
Film adaptation

2002 Australian novels
Novels by Judy Pascoe
Australian novels adapted into films
2002 debut novels